There have been two baronetcies created for members of the Scottish Pringle family, one in the Baronetage of Nova Scotia and one in the Baronetage of Great Britain.

The Pringle Baronetcy, of Stichill in the County of Roxburgh, was created in the Baronetage of Nova Scotia on 5 January 1683 for Robert Pringle. The fourth Baronet sat as Member of Parliament for Berwickshire.

The Pringle Baronetcy, of Pall Mall, was created in the Baronetage of Great Britain on 5 June 1766 for the physician John Pringle. He was the youngest son of the second Baronet of the 1673 creation. The title became extinct on his death in 1782.

Pringle baronets, of Stichill (1683)

Sir Robert Pringle, 1st Baronet (died )
Sir John James Pringle, 2nd Baronet (1662–1721)
Sir Robert Pringle, 3rd Baronet (1690–1779)
Sir James Pringle, 4th Baronet (1726–1809)
Sir John Pringle, 5th Baronet (1784–1869)
Sir Norman Pringle, 6th Baronet (1787–1870)
Sir Norman William Drummond Pringle, 7th Baronet (1836–1897)
Sir Norman Robert Pringle, 8th Baronet (1871–1919)
Squadron Leader Norman Hamilton Pringle, de facto 9th Baronet (1903–1961), putative and legal son of 8th Baronet, recognised during his lifetime but removed from the Official Roll of the Baronetage in 2016 following DNA evidence that he was not the biological son of the 8th Baronet.
Lt-Gen Steuart Robert Pringle, de facto 10th Baronet   (1928–2013), son of the de facto 9th Baronet, recognised during his lifetime but removed from the Official Roll of the Baronetage in 2016 following DNA evidence that his father was not the biological son of the 8th Baronet.
Sir Ronald Steuart Pringle, de jure 9th Baronet (1905–1968), eldest biological son of 8th Baronet, not recognised during his lifetime but added posthumously to the Official Roll of the Baronetage in 2016.
Sir Norman Murray Archibald MacGregor Pringle, 10th Baronet (b. 1941), son of the de jure 9th Baronet.

The heir apparent to the Baronetcy is the present holder's only son, Alastair Steuart Ronald Pringle (b. 1972).

2013–2016 dispute over lineage
After the 2013 death of Steuart Pringle, the 10th de facto Baronet, the title was claimed by his eldest son, Simon. DNA testing, however, originally gathered by Murray Pringle (the current 10th Baronet) with the stated aim of determining the current clan chief of the Clan Pringle (dormant since 1738), showed that Steuart Pringle was not genetically related to the rest of the Pringle clan. Murray Pringle then contested the title and claimed it for himself, on the basis that the 9th baronet should have been recognised as his father, Ronald Steuart Pringle (9th de jure baronet), the younger, legitimate son of the 8th baronet. While the dispute continued, the baronetcy was dormant, due to the conflicting claims of Murray Pringle and Simon Pringle, since neither had proven their right of succession to the baronetcy over the other. As a consequence neither was entered on the Official Roll of the Baronetage.

The Queen, acting under the Judicial Committee Act 1833, referred the matter to the Judicial Committee of the Privy Council, which held its hearings on the matter in November 2015 and January 2016. It delivered its ruling on 20 June 2016, determining that DNA evidence proved that Sir Norman Hamilton Pringle, 9th de facto Baronet, was conceived by an unknown father and was not the biological son of Sir Norman Robert Pringle, 8th Baronet.

In delivering the judgment, Lord Hodge stated that his court had no reason to reject DNA evidence considered valid in other cases, and that it was not the place of the court to consider social ramifications of rulings over legitimacy:

On 27 June 2016, Grant Bavister, Assistant Register to the Baronetage at the Ministry of Justice, entered Sir Ronald Steuart Pringle and his son Sir Murray Pringle onto the Official Roll of the Baronetage, as the 9th and 10th de jure Baronets. He also removed the de facto 9th and 10th Baronets, Norman Hamilton Pringle and his son Steuart Robert Pringle, from the Roll, in accordance with the Royal Warrant of 1910. Certificates of succession to this effect were issued to Sir Murray Pringle on 1 July 2016.

Pringle baronets, of Pall Mall (1766)
Sir John Pringle, 1st Baronet (1707–1782)

See also
Clan Pringle

References

External links
The Clan Pringle Association

Baronetcies in the Baronetage of Nova Scotia
Extinct baronetcies in the Baronetage of Great Britain
1683 establishments in Nova Scotia
1766 establishments in Great Britain